The 2018 Group 10 Rugby League season was the 72nd season of premier competition of rugby league in the Central West area of New South Wales. It was run under the auspices of the Country Rugby League. It was the sixth consecutive season to feature nine teams, after the re-admittance of the Blayney Bears in 2013.

Orange CYMS entered the season as defending champions, after defeating Oberon Tigers 23–22 in the 2017 premier league decider. CYMS rallied from 22–8 down with 20 minutes remaining to claim the one-point victory. On the back of off-season recruits which included former South Sydney, Manly and Newcastle forward Josh Starling, Oberon Tigers were labelled the early premiership favourites.

Premier League season summary

Eighteen rounds were contested from April until August, resulting in the top of Cowra Magpies, Orange Hawks, Orange CYMS, Bathurst Panthers and Oberon Tigers. Cowra Magpies won their first minor premiership since 1996.

St Pat's played its first home game at the new Jack Arrow Sporting Complex on April 22, a 16–10 victory over Oberon Tigers. St Pat's originally left its spiritual home of Jack Arrow Oval, at the now Paddy's Hotel, at the end of the 2012 season. The club had been playing its home games at the Bathurst Sports Ground, next door to city rivals Panthers at Carrington Park.

Round 10 was cancelled after snow closed roads to Oberon on June 17. Roads between Oberon and Bathurst were closed on the day, meaning Cowra Magpies were unable to travel to Oberon for their match against the Tigers. Games could have been played in Mudgee, Orange and Bathurst but Group 10 officials were hesitant to find itself in a situation where some games could have been played and some couldn't. Rescheduled mid-week games were not possible, due to being a logistical nightmare. All matches were scrapped and one point was awarded each. Because Orange CYMS had bye that weekend, a decision was made to scrap bye points in the second half of the season, so Orange CYMS wouldn't receive an unfair advantage.

After 16 rounds, Orange Hawks looked likely to claim a first minor premiership since 2013 but after losing to Oberon Tigers 22–20 at Wade Park on August 5, Cowra Magpies jumped into first place after a massive 58–14 win over Mudgee Dragons at Sid Kallas Oval on the same day. Magpies won their final match of the home and away season, 34–16 against Lithgow Workies, to seal their first minor premiership since 1996.

Cowra captain Josh Rainbow was named the Group 10 player of the year on August 31, becoming just the fourth Cowra player to do so, the most recent Magpies player Dean Corrigan winning in 2009. Rainbow earned 17 votes, to finish ahead of Orange Hawks captain-coach Willie Heta with 14 and 2016 winner Jeremy Gordon with 11, Rainbow's fellow teammate who won the award with Bathurst Panthers.

Teams

Ladder

Play-off bracket
The Group 10 Rugby League finals use the top five McIntyre system:

Finals

Grand Final

Cowra Magpies hosted its first grand final since 2014, where they lost 34–12 to Bathurst St Pat's. The match will also be Bathurst Panthers first Group 10 premier league grand final since 2007, when they defeated Lithgow Workies 24–4 at Carrington Park.

Cowra hooker and former St Pat's hooker Benji John opened the scoring from dummy-half and Lee McClintock finished off a sweeping play from left to right to give the hosts a 10–0 lead inside the opening 13 minutes.

It became an arm wrestle and Panthers hung in, determined not to concede again. It was in the 57th when the deadlock was broken with Panthers’ lock Blake Hewitt crashing over and Willie Wright converted to reduce the deficit to 10–6.

With minutes remaining, still trailing 10–6, Panthers winger Andrew Mendes scored the equaliser and Wright’s opportunity arose. Having missed his aunty’s wedding to play the grand final, Wright made sure he slotted it, and from his boot, he knew it was going over.

To make it even sweeter, the successful conversion was struck directly in front of the Panthers faithful on the eastern side of the ground. The victory marked Panthers’ first Group 10 premier league title since 2007.

Hewitt lifted the Western Challenge Cup soon after and Panthers powerhouse Brent Seager was presented the Dave Scott Medal for player of the match.

Bathurst Panthers 12 (Blake Hewitt, Andrew Mendes tries; Willie Wright 2 conversions)

Cowra Magpies 10 (Benji John, Lee McClintock tries; Caley Mok conversion)

Top try-scorers

Top point-scorers

References

External links
Group 10 ladder - from Sporting Pulse
Group 10 on Country Rugby League's official site

2018 in Australian rugby league
Rugby league competitions in New South Wales